Russell Earl Banks (March 28, 1940 – January 7, 2023) was an American writer of fiction and poetry. His novels are known for "detailed accounts of domestic strife and the daily struggles of ordinary often-marginalized characters". His stories usually revolve around his own childhood experiences, and often reflect "moral themes and personal relationships".

Banks was a member of the International Parliament of Writers and a member of the American Academy of Arts and Letters.

Life and career 
Russell Earl Banks was born in Newton, Massachusetts, on March 28, 1940, and grew up "in relative poverty." He is the son of Florence (née Taylor), a homemaker, and Earl Banks, a plumber, and was raised in Barnstead, New Hampshire. His father deserted the family when Banks was aged 12. While he was awarded a scholarship to attend Colgate University, he dropped out six weeks into university and travelled south instead, with the "intention of joining Fidel Castro's insurgent army in Cuba, but wound up working in a department store in Lakeland, Florida". He married Darlene Bennett, who was working as a sales clerk at the time; they had one daughter and later divorced.

According to an interview with The Independent, he started to write when he was living in Miami in the late-1950s, though an interview with The Paris Review dates this to Banks's subsequent spell living in Boston. He moved back to New England in 1964 and then to North Carolina, where he attended the University of North Carolina at Chapel Hill, funded by the family of his second wife, Mary Gunst. In Chapel Hill, Banks was involved in Students for a Democratic Society and protest during the Civil Rights Movement. In 1976, he was awarded a Guggenheim Fellowship. Banks divorced Mary Gunst in 1977 after 14 years of marriage. They had three daughters. He was subsequently married to Kathy Walton, an editor at Harper & Row, from 1982 to 1988. The following year, he married poet Chase Twichell. 

Banks was the 1985 recipient of the John Dos Passos Prize for fiction. Continental Drift and Cloudsplitter were finalists for the 1986 and 1999 Pulitzer Prize for Fiction respectively. Banks was elected a Fellow of the American Academy of Arts and Sciences in 1996.

In popular culture, Banks was briefly mentioned in philosopher Richard Rorty's 1996 future history essay "Fraternity Reigns" in The New York Times Magazine as having written the fictional book Trampling the Vineyards, described as "samizdat", in 2021.

Banks lived in upstate New York and Miami. He was a New York State Author for 2004–2006. He was also Artist-in-Residence at the University of Maryland. He taught creative writing at Princeton University.

Death
Banks died from cancer at his home in Saratoga Springs, New York, on January 7, 2023, at the age of 82.

Works and themes
His work has been translated into twenty languages and has received numerous international prizes and awards. He wrote fiction, and, later, non-fiction, with Dreaming up America. His main works include the novels Continental Drift, Rule of the Bone, Cloudsplitter, The Sweet Hereafter, and Affliction. The latter two novels were each made into feature films in 1997 (see The Sweet Hereafter and Affliction).
Many of Banks's works reflect his working-class upbringing. His stories often show people facing tragedy and downturns in everyday life, expressing sadness and self-doubt, but also showing resilience and strength in the face of their difficulties. Banks also wrote short stories, some of which appear in the collection The Angel on the Roof, as well as poetry.

Banks also lived in Jamaica. Interviewed in 1998 for The Paris Review, he stated that:

The themes of Continental Drift (1985) include globalization and unrest in Haiti. His 2004 novel The Darling is largely set in Liberia and deals with the racial and political experience of the white American narrator.

Writing in the Journal of American Studies, Anthony Hutchison argues that, "[a]side from William Faulkner it is difficult to think of a white twentieth-century American writer who has negotiated the issue of race in as sustained, unflinching and intelligent a fashion as Russell Banks".

Reception
According to Robert Faggen in The Paris Review, Banks's debut novel, Family Life, "was not a critical success". His next volume, a collection of short stories called Searching for Survivors, won Banks an O. Henry Award. A second collection of short stories, The New World, published in 1978, "received acclaim for its blending of historical and semi-autobiographical material".

Many have admired Banks' realistic writing, which often explores American social dilemmas and moral struggles. Reviewers have appreciated his portrayal of the working-class people struggling to overcome destructive relationships, poverty, drug abuse, and spiritual confusion. Scholars have variously compared his fiction to the works of Raymond Carver, Richard Ford, and Andre Dubus. Christine Benvenuto commented that "Banks writes with an intensely focused empathy and a compassionate sense of humor that help to keep readers, if not his characters, afloat through the misadventures and outright tragedies of his books."

In 2011, The Guardians Tom Cox selected Cloudsplitter as one of his "overlooked classics of American literature".

Awards and honors

1985 John Dos Passos Prize
1996 Fellow of the American Academy of Arts and Sciences
2004-2006 New York State Author
2012 Carnegie Medal for Excellence in Fiction, shortlist, Lost Memory of Skin

Works

Novels
 Family Life (1975)
 Hamilton Stark (1978)
 The Book of Jamaica (1980)
 The Relation of My Imprisonment (1983)
 Continental Drift (1985)
 Affliction (1989)
 The Sweet Hereafter (1991)
 Rule of the Bone (1995)
 Cloudsplitter (1998)
 The Darling (2004)
 The Reserve (2008)
 Lost Memory of Skin (2011)
 Foregone (2021)
 The Magic Kingdom (2022)

Story collections
 Searching for Survivors (1975) 
 The New World (1978)
 Trailerpark (1981)
 Success Stories (1986)
 The Angel on the Roof (2000)
 A Permanent Member of the Family (2013)

Poetry
 Waiting To Freeze (1969)
 Snow (1974)

Nonfiction
 Invisible Stranger (1998)
 Dreaming Up America (2008)
 Voyager (2016)

References

Further reading

External links

Literary links
http://www.albany.edu/writers-inst/webpages4/archives/banksr.html
Russell Banks reads his short story "The Moor" on This American Life
Russell Banks Papers at the Harry Ransom Center at the University of Texas at Austin
Essay on Banks' short stories

Interviews
 
 Interview, 2003: https://www.januarymagazine.com/profiles/rbanks.html
Interview, March, 2008
Interview with Russell Banks when "The Darling" was published

Interview with Russell Banks, A DISCUSSION WITH National Authors on Tour TV Series, Episode #159 (1995)

1940 births
2023 deaths
20th-century American novelists
20th-century American male writers
American male screenwriters
Deaths from cancer in New York (state)
University of North Carolina at Chapel Hill alumni
Members of the American Academy of Arts and Letters
Writers from Newton, Massachusetts
Princeton University faculty
Fellows of the American Academy of Arts and Sciences
21st-century American novelists
American male novelists
American male short story writers
20th-century American short story writers
21st-century American short story writers
People from Keene, New York
PEN/Faulkner Award for Fiction winners
American Book Award winners
21st-century American male writers
Novelists from New Jersey
Novelists from Massachusetts
Screenwriters from New York (state)
Screenwriters from Massachusetts
Screenwriters from New Jersey